Charles Frederick Hall (18 December 18159 February 1874) was an English violinist and director of the Adelphi Theatre, London.

Early life 

He was born 18 December 1815 in Norwich, Norfolk, England, the son of actor William Frederick Hall and Jane Greenfield. He was baptized at St Michael at Thorn, Norwich, Christmas Day, 1815. He was baptized again in the Swedenborgian church in Norwich as a teenager

As a boy, Hall joined the juvenile opera company of London impresario Robert William Elliston at the Surrey Theatre, London. He returned home to Norwich after Elliston's death in 1831. He then studied the violin with Friedrich Mueller, musical director of the Theatre Royal Norwich. In 1835, at the age of 15, Hall played a violin solo, an air by Joseph Mayseder, in a benefit concert. That same year, the Norwich business directory listed Hall as a professor of the violin, piano, guitar, and singing. He also performed at local dances and parties with a quadrille band he founded.

Moving to London 

At the age of 25, Hall moved to London. There he studied at the Royal Academy of Music and gave the occasional lecture at the Holborn Literary Institution.  By the early fall of 1842, Hall earned the position of second leader in the Drury Lane Theatre orchestra "after a contest of skill." Hall also began composing vocal pieces while in London, including the ballads "The Soft Evening Hour," "There is a Hope," "I have dream'd of hopes defeated," and "The Inconstant."

First marriage 

On 6 November 1844, Hall married Eleanor Eliza Jane "Ellen" Vining at St James Church, Clerkenwell. They lived for a time at 33 North Street, near Kings Cross station, where their only child, Charles King Hall, was born in August 1845.

Concert organizer 

In 1847, Hall, along with George Smith, former manager of the Theatre Royal Norwich, invited the Swedish soprano Jenny Lind to give two concerts in Norwich.  Hall's stepfather, George Gedge, put up 1,000 pounds for the concerts. Jenny Lind performed in St Andrew's Hall, Norwich, on the 22 and 23 September 1847. She gave an impromptu concert the morning of the 24th before leaving the city. The professional musicians who accompanied Lind had been specially selected by Hall from the Covent Garden Opera House, Drury Lane Theatre, and the Royal Philharmonic Society. Michael Balfe conducted this orchestra while Hall acted as leader. Additionally, Hall performed a solo himself each evening.

Two years later Hall and his business partner, William Howlett, a Norwich merchant, staged six consecutive nights of "grand concerts and balls" during the city of Norwich's annual agricultural week. Hall and Howlett booked two international singers for the concerts:  mezzo-soprano Jetty Treffz and baritone Johann Baptiste Pischek. Hall's wife made her stage debut at the first concert, in which she sang soprano in a trio and accompanied Jetty Treffz on the piano. The six concerts were a financial failure. As the Norfolk Chronicle put it, "the spirited entrepreneurs [Hall and Howlett] have sustained a heavy loss." Later that same year, the Choral Society of Norwich staged a benefit concert of Handel's Messiah expressly in aid of Hall and his partner.

Director of Adelphi Theatre 

From 1859 to 1860, Hall held the position of musical director at the newly rebuilt Adelphi Theatre, London.

Second marriage 

In 1866 Hall married actress Caroline Eliza Latham Haselton, with whom he lived at 179 Hampstead Road, near Euston Station.

Death 

Charles Frederick Hall died on 9 February 1874 at 8 Deane Street, Liverpool, England, at the age of 58. He was buried two days later in Anfield Cemetery, Liverpool. The burial register records his profession as professor of music. A flat tombstone says, "In Affectionate Remembrance of Charles Frederick Hall, who died Feb 9th 1874, aged 58.

References 

1815 births
1874 deaths
19th-century English musicians
19th-century violinists
British male violinists
Burials at Anfield Cemetery
English violinists
Musicians from Norwich
19th-century British male musicians